A bat bridge is a structure of varying construction crossing a new or altered road to aid the navigation of bats following the destruction of a hedgerow, and to cause the bats to cross the roadway at a sufficient height to avoid traffic. Bats are thought to follow the lines of hedgerows and woods, and removing these may confuse the bats.

The theory is that these "bridges" will be seen by the bats' sonar as linear features sufficiently similar to the old hedgerows as to provide an adequate substitute.  The English Highways Agency is performing a study of those on the Dobwalls bypass to determine if this assumption is justified.

Usage

France 

The first bridge to be installed in France is on the A65 motorway between junctions for Roquefort and Caloy in the Landes department.

Two additional bat bridges were completed in November 2012 near Balbigny, on the A89 motorway.

Germany 

Two metal bridges were built in 2013 to protect the Mouse-eared Bat at Biberach an der Riss, Baden-Wuerttemberg. The structures cost £375,000 (400,000 €).

United Kingdom

Bat bridges have been implemented in the United Kingdom by various agencies, including the Highways Agency, with support of the Bat Conservation Trust.

At A38 Dobwalls Bypass, the bridges are more elaborate and sophisticated than the earlier Welsh structures, which consisted of cables strung from poles.

Criticism 
The overall cost of bat bridges has been criticised in the House of Lords by Lord Marlesford.

A team from the University of Leeds examined the effectiveness of bat bridges, gantries and underpasses. They found that one underpass, placed on a commuting route, was used by 96% of bats, but few bats used the other underpasses and gantries, preferring routes which put them in the path of traffic.

See also
Squirrel bridge
Wildlife crossing

References

External links
Roads, Bat Bridges and Gantries: A position statement from Bat Conservation Trust

Bats and humans
Bat conservation
Conservation projects
Bridges